Haaltert is a municipality located in the Belgian province of East Flanders in the Denderstreek. In 2021, Haaltert had a total population of 18,892. The total area is 30.30 km². The current mayor of Haaltert is Veerle Baeyens, from the N-VA.

There is a 205 hectare nature reserve Den Dotter in the sub-municipalities of Aaigem (municipality Erpe-Mere) and Heldergem (municipality Haaltert). Haaltert is crossed by the Molenbeek-Ter Erpenbeek creek in Heldergem, Kerksken, and Haaltert.

Gallery

References

External links
Official website 

 
Municipalities of East Flanders
Populated places in East Flanders